Ted Chiang (born 1967) is an American science fiction writer. His work has won four Nebula awards, four Hugo awards, the John W. Campbell Award for Best New Writer, and six Locus awards. His short story "Story of Your Life" was the basis of the film Arrival (2016). He was an artist in residence at the University of Notre Dame in 2020–2021.

Early life, family and education
Ted Chiang was born in 1967 in Port Jefferson, New York. His Chinese name is Chiang Feng-nan. Both of his parents were born in Mainland China and immigrated to Taiwan with their families during the Chinese Communist Revolution before immigrating to the United States. His father, Fu-pen Chiang, is a distinguished professor of mechanical engineering at Stony Brook University. 

Chiang graduated from Brown University with a computer science degree.

Career 
Chiang began submitting stories to magazines in high school. After attending the Clarion Workshop in 1989 he sold his first story, "The Tower of Babylon", to Omni magazine.

, he was working as a technical writer in the software industry and resided in Bellevue, Washington, near Seattle. Chiang was an instructor at the Clarion Workshop at UC San Diego in 2012 and 2016.

Chiang has published eighteen short stories, novelettes, and novellas

Reception
Critic John Clute has written that Chiang's work has a "tight-hewn and lucid style... [which] has a magnetic effect on the reader".

Chiang has commented on "metacognition, or thinking about one’s own thinking" being something most humans, but neither animals nor current AI, are capable of, and that capitalism erodes the capacity for this insight, especially for tech company executives.

Awards
Chiang has won the following science fiction awards for his works: a Nebula Award for "Tower of Babylon" (1990); the John W. Campbell Award for Best New Writer in 1992; a Nebula Award and the Theodore Sturgeon Award for "Story of Your Life" (1998); a Sidewise Award for "Seventy-Two Letters" (2000); a Nebula Award, Locus Award, and Hugo Award for his novelette "Hell Is the Absence of God" (2002); a Locus Award for his short story collection Stories of Your Life and Others (2003); a Nebula and Hugo Award for his novelette "The Merchant and the Alchemist's Gate" (2007); a British Science Fiction Association Award, a Locus Award, and the Hugo Award for Best Short Story for "Exhalation" (2009); a Hugo Award and Locus Award for his novella "The Lifecycle of Software Objects" (2010); a Locus Award for his short story collection Exhalation: Stories (2020); and a Locus Award for his novelette "Omphalos" (2020).

Chiang turned down a Hugo nomination for his short story "Liking What You See: A Documentary" in 2003, on the grounds that the story was rushed due to editorial pressure and did not turn out as he had really wanted.

In 2013, his collection of translated stories  won the German Kurd-Laßwitz-Preis for best foreign science fiction.

Republication
His novelette The Merchant and the Alchemist's Gate (2007) was also published in The Magazine of Fantasy & Science Fiction. The Great Silence was included in The Best American Short Stories anthology for 2016.

Works

Short stories 
"Tower of Babylon", Omni, 1990 (Nebula Award winner)
 "Division by Zero", Full Spectrum 3, 1991
 "Understand", Asimov's Science Fiction, 1991
 "Story of Your Life", Starlight 2, 1998 (Nebula Award, Theodore Sturgeon Award and Seiun Award winner)
 "The Evolution of Human Science" (also known as "Catching Crumbs from the Table"), Nature, 2000
 "Seventy-Two Letters",  Vanishing Acts, 2000 (Sidewise Award winner)
 "Hell Is the Absence of God", Starlight 3, 2001 (Hugo Award, Locus Award, Nebula Award and Seiun Award winner)
 "Liking What You See: A Documentary", Stories of Your Life and Others, 2002
 "What's Expected of Us",  Nature, 2005
 "The Merchant and the Alchemist's Gate", Subterranean Press, 2007 and F&SF, September 2007 (Nebula Award, Hugo Award and Seiun Award winner)
 "Exhalation",  Eclipse 2, 2008 (BSFA, Locus Award, and Hugo Award winner)
 "The Lifecycle of Software Objects", Subterranean Press, July 2010 (Locus Award, Hugo Award and Seiun Award winner)
 "Dacey's Patent Automatic Nanny", The Thackery T. Lambshead Cabinet of Curiosities (edited by Jeff VanderMeer and Ann VanderMeer) June 2011
 "The Truth of Fact, the Truth of Feeling", Subterranean Press Magazine, August 2013
 "The Great Silence", e-flux Journal, May 2015 (included in The Best American Short Stories, 2016)
 "Omphalos", Exhalation: Stories, 2019
 "Anxiety Is the Dizziness of Freedom", Exhalation: Stories, 2019
 "It's 2059, and the Rich Kids are Still Winning", New York Times, 2019

Collections
 Stories of Your Life and Others (Tor, 2002; Locus Award for Best Collection), republished as Arrival (Picador, 2016)
 Exhalation: Stories (Knopf, May 2019)

Film

The screenwriter Eric Heisserer adapted Chiang's story "Story of Your Life" into the 2016 film Arrival. Directed by Denis Villeneuve, the film stars Amy Adams and Jeremy Renner.

Personal life
As of 2016, Chiang lives in Bellevue, Washington with his partner, Marcia Glover.

References

External links

 Stories of Ted Chiang’s Life and Others Ted Chiang Interview
 Ted Chiang on the Future Video of a speech by Ted Chiang
 Interview conducted by Al Robertson
 Interview conducted by Lou Anders
 Interview conducted by Gavin J. Grant
 
 Ted Chiang's online fiction at Free Speculative Fiction Online
 
 

1967 births
20th-century American short story writers
21st-century American short story writers
American alternate history writers
American male novelists
American male short story writers
American people of Taiwanese descent
American science fiction writers
American writers of Chinese descent
Brown University alumni
American atheists
Hugo Award-winning writers
John W. Campbell Award for Best New Writer winners
Living people
Nebula Award winners
Sidewise Award winners
People from Bellevue, Washington
People from Port Jefferson, New York
Date of birth missing (living people)
University of Notre Dame faculty
20th-century American male writers
21st-century American male writers